Sacramento is an unincorporated community in southeastern Hubley Township, Schuylkill County, Pennsylvania, United States, situated on Route 25. It is located on the Pine Creek, which drains it westward into the Mahantango Creek. It has a post office with the zip code of 17968.

References

Unincorporated communities in Schuylkill County, Pennsylvania
Unincorporated communities in Pennsylvania